Paralaea porphyrinaria is a moth of the family Geometridae. It is found in southern Australia, including Tasmania.

The wingspan is about 60 mm.

The larvae feed on the foliage of Eucalyptus species.

External links
Australian Faunal Directory
Australian Insects
An overview of the Tasmanian geometrid moth fauna (Lepidoptera: Geometridae) and its conservation status

Moths of Australia
Geometridae
Moths described in 1857
Taxa named by Achille Guenée